Who Is Mike Jones? is the debut studio album by American rapper Mike Jones, released on April 19, 2005 in the United States. The singles from the album are "Still Tippin'" and "Back Then".

The CD also comes in a "limited edition" version, which includes a bonus CD featuring nearly all the tracks from the album chopped and screwed by DJ Michael 5000 Watts.

The album was a commercial success for the rapper, debuting at number 3 on the Billboard 200 with 181,000 copies sold in its first week and was certified Platinum by the RIAA, two months after its release.

The songs "Got It Sewed Up (Remix)" and "Back Then" are featured in the 2007 Xbox 360 video game Def Jam: Icon. Mike Jones is a playable character in the video game and provides his own voice and likeness.

Critical reception

Steve 'Flash' Juon of RapReviews found Jones lacking in terms of charisma and topic matter as a rapper but praised the beats by Salih Williams throughout the record saying, "The bottom line is that Who Is Mike Jones? is a very enjoyable album if you're not paying attention too closely." Nathan Brackett of Rolling Stone called the album "a fine introduction to this Texas mess." AllMusic's Andy Kellman said that the people throughout the record outshine Jones but found him accessible to listen to, concluding that "Jones is ultimately very likable, shown best in the closing track, a sweet tribute to his supportive late grandmother." Samantha Watson of The Situation praised the southern production, Jones's attention-grabbing delivery and the tracks for being lyrically different, concluding that, "This is a welcomed debut from the rapper Mike Jones. It may sound cliché, but with nearly every track echoing his name and with his sharp rhymes it will be hard to forget who he is." Julianne Shepherd of Pitchfork also praised the album's production and noted that Jones shows some empathy on tracks like "5 Years from Now" and "Grandma", saying that, "Who Is Mike Jones? is an ample showcase for Swishahouse producers Michael K. Watts and Salih Williams, but it'd be a better record if Jones diversified."

Track listing

Original release

Chopped & Screwed version
 Got It Sewed Up [Mix]
 Screw Dat [Mix]
 Cuttin' [Mix]
 Still Trippin' [Mix] featuring Slim Thug and Paul Wall
 Back Then [Mix]
 Know What I'm Sayin' [Mix] featuring Bun B and Lil' KeKe
 Laws Patrolling [Mix] featuring CJ, Mellow and Lil' Bran
 Turing Lane [Mix]
 Grandma [Mix]
 Flossin' [Mix] featuring Big Moe
 Scandalous Hoes [Mix] featuring Lil' Bran
 What Ya Know About... [Mix] featuring Paul Wall and Killa Kyleon
 5 Years From Now [Mix] featuring Lil' Bran

Sample credits
"Back Then"
"Boyz-N-The-Hood" (1987) by Eazy-E
"Still Tippin'" (2004) by Mike Jones feat. Slim Thug and Paul Wall
"Flossin'"
We've Only Just Begun" (1987) by Glenn Jones
"Still Tippin'"
"William Tell Overture" by Gioachino Rossini (from a 1990 recording by South German Philharmonic Orchestra and Alfred Scholtz)
"Got It Sewed Up"
"The Nutcracker, Act 2, No 1: Dance of the Sugarplum Fairy" (1892) by Pyotr Ilyich Tchaikovsky
"Scandalous Hoes"
"Thank You Baby" (1975) by The Stylistics
"Grandma"
"Keep Dancing" (1979) by Al Hudson and the Partners

Personnel
Credits for Who Is Mike Jones? adapted from AllMusic.

Coota Bang – freestyle
DJ Paul – mixing
Michael Foster – mixing
Mike Frost – art direction, photography
G Dash – executive producer
Brian "Big Bass" Gardner – mastering
Juicy J – mixing
Kojack – audio production
Archie Lee – freestyle
Mike B. – audio production
Towdown – mixing
Michael Watts – audio production
Salih Williams – audio production
Young Sears – audio production

Charts and certifications

Weekly charts

Certifications

Year-end charts

See also
 List of Billboard number-one R&B albums of 2005
 List of number-one rap albums of 2005 (U.S.)

References

2005 debut albums
Mike Jones (rapper) albums
Jive Records albums
Warner Records albums
Albums produced by DJ Paul
Albums produced by Juicy J